Cedar Creek Bridge may refer to:

in the United States
(by state)
Cedar Creek Bridge (Petit Jean State Park, Arkansas), listed on the NRHP in Arkansas
Cedar Creek Bridge (Rosie, Arkansas), listed on the NRHP in Arkansas
Cedar Creek Bridge (Rudy, Arkansas), formerly on the NRHP in Arkansas
Cedar Creek Bridge (Elgin, Kansas), listed on the NRHP in Kansas
Cedar Creek Bridge (Haynes, North Dakota), listed on the NRHP in North Dakota